Walter Failer (born 31 December 1946) is an Austrian cross-country skier. He competed in the men's 15 kilometre event at the 1968 Winter Olympics.

References

1946 births
Living people
Austrian male cross-country skiers
Olympic cross-country skiers of Austria
Cross-country skiers at the 1968 Winter Olympics
Place of birth missing (living people)